The 2023 NCAA Division I Football Championship Game was a college football game played on January 8, 2023, at Toyota Stadium in Frisco, Texas. The game determined the national champion of NCAA Division I FCS for the 2022 season. The game featured the two finalists of the 24-team playoff bracket, which began on November 26, 2022. The game begin at 1:04 p.m. CST and was won by the South Dakota State Jackrabbits, who defeated the North Dakota State Bison, 45–21. It was televised on ABC.

Teams

The participants were North Dakota State and South Dakota State, each from the Missouri Valley Football Conference. Both teams advanced through the FCS playoff bracket to reach the championship game.

Entering the game, North Dakota State led the all-time series, 63–45–5, although South Dakota State had won their last three meetings, lasting back to the 2021 spring season. North Dakota State was 4–0 against South Dakota State in the teams' prior meetings in the FCS playoffs. This was their first meeting in the NCAA Division I Football Championship.

North Dakota State

North Dakota State played to a 9–2 regular-season record, suffering losses to Arizona (an FBS program) and South Dakota State. Seeded No. 3 in the FCS playoffs, the Bison received a first-round bye, then defeated Montana, Samford, and Incarnate Word to advance to the championship game.

South Dakota State

South Dakota State played to a 10–1 regular-season record; their only loss was to Iowa (an FBS program). Seeded No. 1 in the FCS playoffs, the Jackrabbits received a first-round bye, then defeated Delaware, Holy Cross, and Montana State to advance to the championship game.

Game summary

Statistics

References

Championship Game
NCAA Division I Football Championship Games
North Dakota State Bison football games
South Dakota State Jackrabbits football games
American football in the Dallas–Fort Worth metroplex
Sports in Frisco, Texas
NCAA Division I Football Championship Game
NCAA Division I Football Championship Game